Grupo Globo, formerly known as Organizações Globo, is a Brazilian private mass media conglomerate based in Rio de Janeiro, Brazil. Founded in 1925 by Irineu Marinho, it is the largest media group in Latin America, and one of the world's largest media conglomerates.

Grupo Globo's assets comprises over-the-air broadcasting, television and film production, pay television subscription service, streaming media, publishing, and online services. Its main properties include the flagship television network TV Globo; pay television content unit Canais Globo, consisting of cable television networks such as GloboNews, GNT, Multishow, SporTV, Viva, Gloob, and the premium film network Telecine; film production company Globo Filmes; radio operator Sistema Globo de Rádio; magazine and newspaper publishers, Editora Globo and Infoglobo; and the streaming service Globoplay.

Grupo Globo also engages in venture capital activities through Globo Ventures, and is the primary supporter of the Roberto Marinho Foundation.

History
The company's first enterprise was the newspaper A Noite. With its success, publishing in the late afternoon, Irineu Marinho decided to launch the morning daily O Globo in 1925. After his sudden death, just weeks after its launch, his son, Roberto Pisani Marinho, became the company's director. Working actively in the media business, Roberto Marinho decided to invest in other areas and launched Radio Globo in 1944. However, the company only became recognizable nationwide after the launching of Rede Globo (now known as TV Globo), the world's second-largest commercial TV network in 1965.

The company is currently run by the sons of Roberto Marinho: Roberto Irineu Marinho, João Roberto Marinho and José Roberto Marinho. In May 2013, a study released by media agency ZenithOptimedia showed Globo occupied the 17th place in a list of the top global media owners. It was the first time the company appeared on this ranking. This ranking remained in 2015, but in 2017 the company's fell to 19th place, and in June of the same year Grupo Globo signed a joint venture deal with Vice Media.

Assets owned by Grupo Globo

Free-to-air television 
 TV Globo 
 Futura
 SATHD Regional (Claro TV+ DTH)
Globo
19 affiliates
Futura (Owner by Globo and SATHD Regional)	
GloboNews (Owner by Globo and SATHD Regional)
Globo Americas (Owner by Globo and SATHD Regional)

Cable television 
 Canais Globo (Company founded in 2020 incorporated into Globo)
 BIS
 Canal OFF
 Combate
 GloboNews
 Gloob
 Gloobinho
 GNT
 Megapix
 Modo Viagem
 Multishow
 Playboy TV
 Premiere 
 Rede Telecine
 Telecine Action
 Telecine Cult
 Telecine Fun
 Telecine Pipoca
 Telecine Premium
 Telecine Touch
 Sextreme
 Sexy Hot
 SporTV
 SporTV 2
 SporTV 3
 SporTV 4
 SporTV 5
 SporTV Plus
 Venus
 Viva
 NBCUniversal International Networks Brasil (joint-venture with Comcast/NBCUniversal)
 Universal TV
 Studio Universal
 Syfy
 DreamWorks
 TV Globo Internacional
 Globosat Comercialização de Conteúdos (G2C)

Radio 
 Sistema Globo de Rádio
 BH FM
 CBN
5 affiliates
 Rádio Globo
 Sound!

Internet 
 Globo.com
 G1
 Ge.globo
 Gshow

Books, newspapers and magazines 
 Editora Globo
 Edições Globo Condé Nast
 Infoglobo
 Extra
 O Globo
 Valor Econômico

Other companies 
 Globo Filmes
 Globoplay

Former properties 
 Som Livre (Acquired by Sony Music in April 2021)
 SKY Brasil (Vrio Corp. acquired the 7% stake in Grupo Globo)
 ZAP Viva Real Group (Acquired by OLX)

Corporate structure 
 João Roberto Marinho (President)
 Roberto Irineu Marinho (Vice president)
 José Roberto Marinho (Vice president)
 Jorge Nobrega (Member of the Board)
 Alberto Pecegueiro (Member of the Board)
 Paulo Marinho (Member of the Board)
 Roberto Marinho Neto (Member of the Board)
 Gabriela Marinho Gouvea (Member of Board)

References

External links
  

 
Companies based in Rio de Janeiro (city)
Mass media companies of Brazil
Privately held companies of Brazil
Mass media companies established in 1925
1925 establishments in Brazil